DAV Racing is an auto racing team based in Italy. Founded in 2012 by former RP Motorsport driver Matteo Davenia, the team began competing in European F3 Open Championships Copa class in 2012, which was won by DAV Racing's Kevin Giovesi. The team began competing in the main championship in 2014 before stepping out of Euroformula Open Championship after the 2016 season.

Former series results

European F3 Open/Euroformula Open

† Shared results with other teams ‡ Guest driver – ineligible for points.

Italian F4 Championship

† Shared results with other teams

Timeline

References

Italian auto racing teams
Euroformula Open Championship teams

Auto racing teams established in 2012